SRJ could mean:

Stockholm–Roslagens Järnvägar, a defunct private railway company in Sweden
Serbia and Montenegro, known as Federal Republic of Yugoslavia from 1992 to 2003
Spherical Rolling Joint, a high precision ball joint consisting of a spherical outer and inner race separated by ball bearings